Melvin Hall Jr. (born September 16, 1960) is an American former professional baseball player and convicted sex offender. He played in Major League Baseball (MLB) from 1981 to 1992 with the Chicago Cubs, Cleveland Indians, New York Yankees, and in 1996 with the San Francisco Giants. Additionally he played in Japan from 1993 to 1995. He primarily played as an outfielder. On June 17, 2009, he was sentenced to 45 years in prison after being found guilty of two counts of sexual assault against minors.

Playing career
Hall made his MLB debut in 1981 with the Chicago Cubs. In his first full Major League season in 1983, Hall hit 17 home runs in 112 games. In 1987, he had the best fielding percentage and range factor of all MLB left-fielders.

In 1991, when Bernie Williams was a rookie, Hall made fun of him by giving him the nickname "Zero". It was alleged that when Williams would talk, Hall would scream "Shut up, Zero!" at him, nearly making him cry. In , Hall hit 15 home runs, drove in a career-high 81 RBIs and had a career high of 163 hits in 152 games with the New York Yankees. During that year's Yankees Old-Timers' Day, he walked onto the field and asked manager Buck Showalter, "Who are these old fucking guys?" Showalter said: "That's when I knew he had to go." That season he earned $1.2 million.

Following the season, after his contract expired and no major league team showed interest in him, the 32-year-old left the major leagues, agreeing to a two-year $4 million contract to play in Japan. He returned to the U.S. to play for the San Francisco Giants in 1996, but was released a month into the season after registering only three singles in 25 games. He signed a minor-league contract with the Chicago White Sox, but was released 12 days later after only playing four games with their Triple-A affiliate, the Nashville Sounds. He retired shortly thereafter.

Sexual assault conviction
Hall was arrested in Lewisville, Texas, on June 21, 2007, and charged with two counts of sexual assault after police in North Richland Hills, Texas, received a report from a woman who reported she was sexually assaulted in March 1999, when she was under the age of 17. During the investigation, a second victim under the age of 14 was identified. One of these girls was 12 at the time of the rape. On June 16, 2009, Hall was convicted on three counts of aggravated sexual assault of a child and two counts of indecency with a child. On June 17, 2009, he was sentenced to 45 years in prison, with 22 years and 4 months minimum. Hall is currently serving his sentence at H. H. Coffield Unit in Tennessee Colony, Texas; his earliest possible parole will be November 15, 2031.

In 2014, SB Nation published a long-form article detailing allegations that Hall serially preyed upon and sexually abused numerous girls throughout his career.

See also

 Chad Curtis, major league baseball player convicted of sexual assault
Luis Polonia, major league baseball player convicted of sexual assault

References

External links

Mel Hall Hassles Williams''

1960 births
Living people
African-American baseball players
American expatriate baseball players in Japan
American people convicted of child sexual abuse
American sportspeople convicted of crimes
Baseball players from New York (state)
Chiba Lotte Marines players
Chicago Cubs players
Chunichi Dragons players
Cleveland Indians players
Coastal Bend Aviators players
Fort Worth Cats players
Geneva Cubs players
Gulf Coast Cubs players
Iowa Cubs players
Major League Baseball left fielders
Midland Cubs players
Nashville Sounds players
New York Yankees players
Nippon Professional Baseball designated hitters
People from Lyons, New York
Prisoners and detainees of Texas
San Francisco Giants players
Springfield/Ozark Mountain Ducks players
People from Cayuga County, New York
21st-century African-American people
20th-century African-American sportspeople